Tihana Lazović (born 25 September 1990) is a Croatian film actress. She is best known for the lead role as Jelena / Nataša / Marija in The High Sun.

Filmography

Film

Television

References

External links
 

1990 births
Living people
Actors from Zadar
Croatian actresses
Croatian film actresses
Golden Arena winners
21st-century Croatian actresses